The following outline is provided as an overview of and topical guide to skiing:

Skiing is a recreational activity using skis as equipment for traveling over snow. Skis are used in conjunction with boots that connect to the ski with use of a binding.

Overview

Lists
 List of ski areas and resorts
 List of ski jumping hills
 List of Olympic venues in freestyle skiing
 List of FIS Cross-Country World Cup champions
 List of FIS Ski Jumping World Cup team medalists
 List of FIS Nordic World Ski Championships medalists in ski jumping
 List of Olympic medalists in freestyle skiing
 List of Olympic medalists in ski jumping
 List of presidents of FIS
 List of skiing deaths

Skiers

Types of skiing

Alpine Skiing
 Alpine skiing (also known as downhill skiing)
 Alpine touring (Randonée)
 Extreme skiing
 Freeriding
 Freeskiing (or newschool skiing)
 Freestyle skiing
 Glade Skiing
 Heliskiing
 Mogul skiing
 Monoskiing
 Disabled alpine skiing
 Ski mountaineering
 Skwal
 Snowcat skiing
 Snowkiting
 Speed skiing

Nordic Skiing
 Cross-country skiing
 Backcountry skiing
 Biathlon
 Disabled Nordic skiing
 Nordic combined
 Telemark skiing
 Skijoring
 Ski jumping (ski-flying)
 Ski touring

Non-snow skiing
 Dry ski slope
 Grass skiing
 Sand skiing
 Roller skiing
 Water skiing

Turning techniques
 Stem techniques
 The Snowplough - (also known as the wedge) - see snowplough turn
 The Stem Christie
 Parallel turn
 Carve turn
 Telemark turn
 Pivot turn (skiing)
 Jump turn

Equipment and Apparel

 Skis
 Ski bindings
 Ski boots
 Ski poles with pole guards if a racer
 Ski wax depending on the condition and temperature
 Ski skins if climbing uphill
 Ski suit
 Parka, anorak, or shell
 Ski pants or salopettes
 If a Racer — a race suit
 Fleece top or sweater; the mid-layer or insulating garment
 Thermal underwear and ski socks
 Gloves or mittens to keep hands warm
 Hand Warmers
 Ski helmet
 Goggles or sunglasses to protect eyes from harm
 Face Mask to protect from wind
 Specialized Alpine touring equipment

Competition events
 Winter Olympic Games - A major international sporting event held once every four years for sports practised on snow and ice.
 Winter Paralympic Games
 Four Hills Tournament
 Winter X Games
 Birkebeinerrennet
 American Birkebeiner
 Tour of Anchorage
 The British Land National Ski Championships

Alpine events
 Alpine skiing at the Winter Olympics
 Alpine Skiing World Cup
 Alpine World Skiing Championships
 Slalom
 Giant slalom
 Super Giant Slalom
 Downhill
 Alpine skiing combined
 Speed Skiing

Freestyle events
 Freestyle skiing at the Winter Olympics
 FIS Freestyle Skiing World Cup
 FIS Freestyle World Ski Championships
 Aerials
 Mogul skiing
 Ski ballet
 Half-pipe skiing
 Slopestyle
 Ski cross

Nordic events
 Nordic combined at the Winter Olympics
 FIS Nordic Combined World Cup
 FIS Nordic World Ski Championships
 Biathlon
 Nordic combined
 Ski jumping
 Cross-country skiing (sport)

Skiing organizations
International organizations
 International Biathlon Union (IBU)
 International Ski Federation (FIS)
 International Ski Instructors Association (ISIA)
 International Skiing History Association (ISHA)

National organizations
 Iran Ski Federation
 US National Ski Hall of Fame
 Professional Ski Instructors of America
 Swiss Ski Association (in French and German)
 British Association of Snowsport Instructors
 Ski Club of Great Britain
 United States Ski and Snowboard Association
 Croatian Ski Association / Hrvatski skijaški savez (HSS)
 National Ski Patrol
 CSIA - Canadian Ski Instructors' Alliance
 Alpine Canada Alpin
 U.S. Ski Team
 U.S. Ski and Snowboard Association
 New Zealand Snowsports Instructors Alliance
 Snowsport GB - The British Ski and Snowboard Federation
 CFSA - Canadian Freestyle Ski Association
 SAHK - Ski Association of Hong Kong, China Limited
 Nederlandse Ski Vereniging - Dutch Ski Association

Ski areas and resorts
 Ski resorts
 List of ski areas and resorts
 National Ski Areas Association
 Luxury resorts

Ski lifts

Ski lift
 Aerial tramway (or cable car)
 Gondola lift
 Hybrid lift
 Chairlift
 Detachable chairlift (often a higher speed chairlift)
 Funitel
 Funicular
 Rope tows & handle tows
 Platter lift (or button lift)
 J-bar lift
 T-bar lift
 Magic carpet

Other
 History of skiing
 Artificial ski slope
 Indoor ski slope
 Ski Simulators
 Piste
 Ski resort
 Ski school
 Ski season
 Ski warfare
 Snow
 Snow cannon
 Ice
 Snowcat (piste basher)
 Physics of skiing
 Ski film

Health and injuries
 Altitude sickness
 Injuries
 Anterior cruciate ligament
 Fracture
 First aid
 Wilderness first aid
 Ski patrol
 Frost bite
 Hypothermia
 Windburn
 Physical fitness
 Exercise
 Snow blindness
 Ski sickness
 List of famous skiing deaths
 Shin-bang
 Tree well

See also 

Outline of sports

References

External links 

Skiing
Skiing

Skiing
Skiing